Drugosimonovskaya is a rural locality (a village) in Nizhnekuloyskoye Rural Settlement, Verkhovazhsky District, Vologda Oblast, Russia. The population was 49 as of 2002. There are 2 streets.

Geography 
Drugosimonovskaya is located 32 km southeast of Verkhovazhye (the district's administrative centre) by road. Simonovskaya is the nearest rural locality.

References 

Rural localities in Verkhovazhsky District